Arbab Alamgir Khan is a Pakistani politician who served as member of the National Assembly of Pakistan from 2008 to 2013.

Early life
Khan was born on 1 July 1961 in Peshawar to a former Chief Minister of Khyber Pakhtunkhwa  Arbab Jehangir Khan. He completed his MBBS from Khyber Medical College in 1987 and went on to earn a diploma in Internal Medicine from the University of Edinburgh.

Political career
He ran for the seat of National Assembly of Pakistan from NA-2 (Peshawar-II) as a candidate of Pakistan Peoples Party (PPP) in 2002 Pakistani general election but was unsuccessful.

He was elected to the National Assembly from Constituency NA-2 (Peshawar-II) as a candidate of PPP in 2008 Pakistani general election. In November 2008, he was inducted into the federal cabinet of Prime Minister Yousaf Raza Gillani and was appointed as Federal Minister for communications where he served until June 2012. In June 2012, he was inducted into the federal cabinet of Prime Minister Raja Pervaiz Ashraf and was re-appointed as Federal Minister for communications where he served until March 2013.

He ran for the seat of National Assembly from Constituency NA-2 (Peshawar-II) as a candidate of PPP in 2013 Pakistani general election but was unsuccessful.

Family
He is son of Arbab Jehangir Khan and husband of Asma Arbab Alamgir.

References

Living people
1961 births
People from Peshawar
Pakistani MNAs 2008–2013
Communications Ministers of Pakistan
Alamgir Khan
Khyber Medical College alumni
Alumni of the University of Edinburgh